Women in Technology International (WITI) is an organization promoting the achievements of women in technology and extending support, opportunities, and inspiration. It was founded by Carolyn Leighton in 1989 as the International Network of Women in Technology. It was renamed to the WITI Professional Association in 2001 when it acted as a trade association for women in technology.

It is known for producing the Women in Technology International Hall of Fame, which inducts women who have made a significant contribution to technology.

Started from an email group in 1989, by 2012 the group had grown to 2 million people and became the leading organization for women in technology.
The 2014 WITI 25-year conference Powering Up! included speakers such as Gwynne Shotwell, President and Chief Operating Officer at SpaceX. In 2022, Randstad Technologies announced a partnership with WITI to address gender underrepresented groups in the workplace and encourage girls and women to pursue technology education and careers.

See also
 AnitaB.org
 Girls in Tech
 National Center for Women & Information Technology

References

External links 
 Official site

Organizations for women in science and technology
Women in technology